Chloe Wang may refer to:

 Chloe Bennet (Chloe Wang, born 1992), American actress and singer
 Chloe Wang (Taiwanese actress) (born 1986), Taiwanese actress, singer and host